The Local Bad Man is a 1932 American pre-Code Western film directed by Otto Brower.

Cast
 Hoot Gibson as Jim Bonner
 Sally Blane as Marion Meade
 Hooper Atchley as Joe Murdock
 Edward Hearn as Ben Murdock
 Edward Peil Sr. as Sheriff Hickory
 Milton Brown as "Horsetail" Wright

External links
 
 

1932 films
1932 Western (genre) films
American black-and-white films
American Western (genre) films
Films directed by Otto Brower
1930s English-language films
1930s American films